Heron Island may refer to:

Heron Island (Queensland), in Australia
Heron Island (New Brunswick), in Baie des Chaleurs, Canada
Heron Island (Quebec), in the Saint Lawrence River, Canada
Heron Island, Berkshire, on the River Thames, England
Heron Island, Maryland, on the Potomak River, USA
Heron Island, County Fermanagh, a townland in County Fermanagh, Northern Ireland
Heron Island, South Bristol, Maine, shortened from full name: Inner Heron Island
Heron Island in Kelsey Park, London, England